Spaceballs: The Animated Series, also known as Spaceballs: The Series, is an adult animated television series that premiered in 2008 on G4 and Canada's Super Channel, and is loosely based on the parody science fiction film Spaceballs. Similarly to how the original film parodied the original Star Wars films and the Star Trek universe, each episode of the series parodies a different film or other aspect of popular culture, such as the Star Wars prequel trilogy, The Lord of the Rings, or the Grand Theft Auto video games.

Production

Production began in early 2005 under the supervision of Brooksfilms, MGM and Berliner Film Company. Mel Brooks not only directed the writing, but also reprised his roles as President Skroob and Yogurt from the film. Daphne Zuniga and Joan Rivers also reprise their roles from the film, while Bill Pullman and Rick Moranis do not. Those roles are filled by Rino Romano and Dee Bradley Baker, respectively. Tino Insana replaces John Candy, who died in 1994, as "Barf," and Rudy De Luca also supplied his voice talents.

Delayed series premiere

Some promotional items on the series were seen at the 2007 Comic-Con and a total of 13 episodes were planned to debut during the fall of 2007, although this "deadline" passed by with no sign of the show on G4's schedule. A start date of June 1, 2008 was later reported, but the series was delayed once again. Despite the lack of information in the United States, the series premiered on Canada's Super Channel. and remained absent from G4 in America until its eventual series premiere on September 21, 2008. The first two episodes of the series were shown following an airing of the original film.

Cast

Mel Brooks as President Skroob / Yogurt
Daphne Zuniga as Princess Vespa
Joan Rivers as Dot Matrix
Tino Insana as Barf (replacing John Candy) 
Rino Romano as Lone Starr (replacing Bill Pullman)
Dee Bradley Baker as Dark Helmet (replacing Rick Moranis due to his retirement)
Rudy De Luca as Vinnie / Fort Lox Checkpoint official
Julianne Grossman as Charlene / Marlene / Darlene / Yente / The Unsinkable Old Fat Lady  / Commanderette Zircon / Princess Harley Van Patten / Pannakin's mother / Robohooker / Jasmine / Telephone Operator
Dave Wittenberg
Jim Meskimen
Jim Jackman
Dom DeLuise as Pizza the Hutt

Episodes

References

External links

2008 American television series debuts
2009 American television series endings
2000s American adult animated television series
2000s American comic science fiction television series
2000s American parody television series
Adaptations of works by Mel Brooks
American adult animated action television series
American adult animated adventure television series
Animated space adventure television series
American adult animated fantasy television series
American animated science fantasy television series
American adult animated comedy television series
American adult animated science fiction television series
American comic science fiction television series
American flash adult animated television series
Animation based on real people
English-language television shows
G4 (American TV network) original programming
Parody television series based on Star Wars
Animated television shows based on films
Television series by MGM Television
Television series created by Mel Brooks